Payton Turner (born January 7, 1999) is an American football defensive end for the New Orleans Saints of the National Football League (NFL). He played college football at Houston and was drafted by the Saints in the first round of the 2021 NFL Draft.

Early life and high school career
Turner grew up in Houston, Texas and attended Westside High School, where he played basketball and football.

College career
Turner was a member of the Houston Cougars for four seasons, starting his final three years. He was a member of the Cougars' pass rush rotation during his freshman year and  finished the season with 14 tackles, one sack and one interception. His sophomore season ended prematurely due to a foot injury. As a senior, Turner was named second team All-American Athletic Conference after recording 25 tackles, 10.5 for a loss, with five sacks in five games played, missing two games due to injury and opting out of the New Mexico Bowl. After the season, Turner played in the 2021 Senior Bowl.

Professional career

Turner was drafted by the New Orleans Saints in the first round (28th overall) of the 2021 NFL Draft. He signed his four-year rookie contract with New Orleans on June 8, 2021.

On November 11, 2021, Turner was placed on injured reserve with a shoulder injury.

References

External links
Houston Cougars bio

1999 births
Living people
Players of American football from Houston
American football defensive ends
Houston Cougars football players
New Orleans Saints players